The St. Paul Lutheran School, also known as the Lutherville School, is a historic school building in rural Johnson County, Arkansas.  It is located on the east side of County Road 418, northeast of Lamar.  It is a vernacular single-story wood-frame structure, with a gabled roof, weatherboard siding, and a fieldstone foundation.  It was built in 1904, and is (along with the nearby cemetery) one of the only surviving remnants of an early 20th-century German Lutheran immigrant community.

The building was listed on the National Register of Historic Places in 1999.

See also
National Register of Historic Places listings in Johnson County, Arkansas

References

School buildings on the National Register of Historic Places in Arkansas
National Register of Historic Places in Johnson County, Arkansas
School buildings completed in 1904
Schools in Johnson County, Arkansas
1904 establishments in Arkansas
German-American culture in Arkansas
Lutheran schools in the United States